Cookin' in Mobile is a live CD/DVD released by Robert Cray. It was released on July 27, 2010, through Vanguard Records. It is his first live concert released on DVD to date and his third live album. The concert was recorded February 21, 2010, at the historic Saenger Theatre in Mobile, Alabama while on tour supporting his latest album This Time.

Track listing
"Our Last Time"
"Anytime"
"Love 2009"
"Right Next Door (Because Of Me)"
"Chicken in the Kitchen"
"Sitting on Top of the World"
"One in the Middle"
"Lotta Lovin'"
"Smoking Gun"
"I Can't Fail"
"That's What Keeps Me Rockin'"
"Time Makes Two"

DVD extra features
Behind The Scenes Interviews
Phone Booth Performance
Twenty Music Video
Photo Gallery From the Show

Robert Cray Band
Robert Cray - Guitar, Vocals
Jim Pugh - Keyboard
Tony Braunagel - Drums
Richard Cousins - Bass

References

Robert Cray albums
2010 live albums
Live blues albums
Vanguard Records live albums
Live video albums
2010 video albums
Vanguard Records video albums